I Wail Bitterly Today(이 날에 목놓아 통곡하노라) or Si Il ya Bangseong Daegok(시일야방성대곡) is an editorial in the Hwangseong Sinmun(황성신문) on November 20, 1905, which was written by Jang Ji-yeon(장지연), the editor-in-chief of the newspaper. This editorial argued that the Japan-Korea Treaty of 1905 was unlawful and criticized Five Ministers of the Korean government and Ito Hirobumi who contributed to the treaty. It was widely circulated and is considered representative of the Korean reaction to the establishment of a Japanese protectorate.

References

1905 essays
Works about Japan–Korea relations
Works originally published in Korean newspapers